Karen Mulder (born 1 June 1968 or 1970) is a Dutch model and singer. She is well known for her work with Versace, Dior, and Chanel as a supermodel during the 1990s. Mulder repeatedly was featured on the cover of Vogue and was also a Victoria's Secret model, making her one of the original "Angels" and the first from both the brand and from her country. In the early 2000s, she began to speak out about the dark side of the modeling industry and the dangers faced by underage girls and young women.

In 2002, her cover single I Am What I Am which achieved some success in the French charts in 2002., reached No. 13 in France.

Early life 
Mulder was born in 1970 in Vlaardingen, South Holland, Netherlands.  She was raised in The Hague and Voorburg.  Her father, Ben Mulder, is a tax inspector and her mother, Marijke (née de Jong), is a secretary. Mulder has a younger sister, Saskia, who became an actress after a stint studying economics. In 1985, at age 15, Mulder and her family went on a camping trip in the south of France. She saw an ad for Elite Model Management's "Look of the Year" contest in a newspaper. Mulder was wearing braces at the time and dismissed the idea of applying. A friend took some photographs she had of her and sent them to Elite without her knowledge. She won the preliminary contest in Amsterdam, and was sent to the finals of the contest, placing second.  
Mulder soon found herself in high demand for modeling jobs and was signed by Elite Paris.

Career
By her second year on the runway, Mulder was modeling for Valentino, Yves Saint Laurent, Lanvin, Christian Lacroix, Versace, and Giorgio Armani. In 1991, she made the first of many appearances on the cover of Vogue and also landed a contract with Guess. A New York Times article from 1991 described Mulder's work schedule, detailing a typical thirteen hour day packed with obligations to Ralph Lauren, a French film crew, Anna Sui and Giorgio Sant'Angelo.

Mulder appeared on the cover of British and Spanish Vogue in 1991–1992 and became the face of a Nivea advertising campaign. In 1992, Mulder signed a contract with Victoria's Secret. In 1993, she was featured on the cover of Vogue in January and again in March.

Other campaigns she appeared in included Calvin Klein, Claude Montana, Ralph Lauren, Yves Saint-Laurent's Rive Gauche fragrance, as well as Guerlain, Chloé, Revlon, Jacques Fath, Gianfranco Ferré, Gianni Versace, Chanel, and Hervé Léger. Mulder has worked with some of the most well known fashion photographers, including Javier Vallhonrat, Peter Lindbergh, Patrick Demarchelier, Bruce Weber, Helmut Newton, Max Vadukul, Gilles Bensimon, Fabrizio Ferri, Steven Meisel, Irving Penn, Robert Erdmann, and Arthur Elgort.

In the mid-1990s, Mulder's off-the-runway career was managed by her then-partner, Jean-Yves Le Fur. In 1995, he collaborated with Hasbro on a Karen Mulder doll, which spurred development of a line of dolls modeled on the supermodels of the time. Le Fur and Mulder also made an infomercial and video. Mulder released a beauty and fashion CD-ROM, in which she presented makeup, beauty, and exercise tips.

One of the first issues of Top Model magazine was entirely devoted to Mulder along with an entire issue of Italian Vogue. Her two appearances in the Sports Illustrated Swimsuit Issue in 1997 and 1998 and her poses for the Victoria's Secret catalogue increased Mulder's profile. In 1997 she released her own calendar.

For many years, Mulder was among the ten best-paid models in the world. At one point in her career, she was reportedly earning up to £10,000 a day.

In 2000, Mulder retired from modeling for several years.  She made her acting debut in the French short film A Theft, One Night in 2001.

Mulder also pursued music, and released an album including the single I Am What I Am which achieved some success in the French charts in 2002. The single reached No. 13 in France, No. 22 in Belgium's Wallonia region, and No. 81 in Switzerland. In 2004, she worked with Daniel Chenevez of Niagara to create the self-titled CD Karen Mulder.

Return to modeling 
On 1 July 2007, Mulder returned to the catwalk at the Dior Autumn/Winter 07/08 Couture Collection in Paris, modelling alongside Naomi Campbell, Linda Evangelista, Helena Christensen, Amber Valletta, Shalom Harlow, and Stella Tennant.

Personal life
In 1988, at the age of 18, Mulder married French photographer René Bosne. They later divorced in 1993. Mulder stated that her life changed in 1993 when she was shuttling from airport to airport with almost no time at home. She then met real estate developer Jean-Yves Le Fur in the waiting lounge of a Paris airport. They soon became engaged. The relationship with Le Fur ended in 1997.

In 1995, she bought a château in France and set up a programme to provide holidays there for underprivileged children.

Mulder gave birth to a daughter on 30 October 2006.

Abuse, legal issues, and mental health
On 31 October 2001, Mulder was interviewed on the France 2 show Tout le monde en parle (Everyone is Talking About It) hosted by Thierry Ardisson in front of a live studio audience. 
During the shows taping, Mulder claimed that various people had raped her, including police officers, politicians, members of her former agency Elite Model Management, and Prince Albert of Monaco.
 
The producers of the show did not broadcast the interview, and the recording was erased. Her parents blamed her troubles on drugs.

Days later, Mulder repeated her allegations, this time to a weekly magazine in an interview conducted in her Paris apartment. Within hours of the interview, her sister Saskia arrived and took her to Villa Montsouris, a psychiatric hospital specializing in such disorders as depression, anxiety, and delirium, where she stayed for five months. The stay reportedly was paid for by Elite models president Gérald Marie, her employer and one of the accused. (It came after the BBC caught Marie on hidden camera trying to give a 15-year-old model £300 for sex, and bragging about Elite Model Look competitors he would sleep with that year.)

On 10 December 2002, after suffering for years from chronic depression, Mulder went into a coma after she overdosed on sleeping pills in an apparent suicide attempt. She left no note. She was rushed to the American Hospital in Neuilly after neighbors found her passed out on the floor of the Paris apartment on exclusive Avenue Montaigne where she was staying with friends.  Mulder's parents flew from the Netherlands to be by her side along with former fiancé Jean-Yves Le Fur. Le Fur was reportedly one of the people who found Mulder unconscious after arriving at the apartment after Mulder had not answered several of his telephone calls. She awoke from her coma the next day.

On 1 July 2009, it was reported that Mulder was arrested in Paris for threatening to attack her plastic surgeon.

References

External links
 
 

Year of birth missing (living people)
Living people
People from Vlaardingen
People from The Hague
Dutch female models
Victoria's Secret Angels